Tim Loustalot (born April 9, 1965) is an American professional golfer who played on the PGA Tour and the Nationwide Tour.

Loustalot joined the Nationwide Tour in 1990. He picked up his first victory on Tour in 1992 at the Ben Hogan Lake City Classic. He went through qualifying school in 1994 to earn his PGA Tour card for 1995. He returned to the Nationwide Tour in 1996 where he picked up his second victory at the NIKE Shreveport Open. He went through qualifying school for the second time in 1997 and returned to the PGA Tour in 1998. He had a better year on Tour than in his rookie season which included finishing in a tie for second at the Deposit Guaranty Golf Classic but he had to go to qualifying school to retain his card and he was successful. After a poor season in 1999 he returned to the Nationwide Tour in 2000 which was his last season on Tour.

Loustalot is currently the head professional at DeLaveaga Golf Club in Santa Cruz, California.

Professional wins (2)

Nike Tour wins (2)

Results in major championships

CUT = missed the halfway cut
Note: Loustalot only played in the U.S. Open.

See also
1994 PGA Tour Qualifying School graduates
1997 PGA Tour Qualifying School graduates
1998 PGA Tour Qualifying School graduates

External links

American male golfers
Fresno State Bulldogs men's golfers
PGA Tour golfers
Golfers from Sacramento, California
1965 births
Living people